Mark Francis Barham (born 12 July 1962) is an English former professional footballer who played as a right-winger.

Barham was a product of the Norwich City youth team, having signed him from his local club Folkestone and Shepway, and made his debut in the 1979–80 season against Manchester United.

He played 213 times for Norwich and scored 25 times. While with the club he was capped twice by England on their 1983 trip to Australia. He was a member of the Norwich sides that won the League Cup in 1985 and the Second Division championship in 1986.

Barham also played for Huddersfield and Middlesbrough, where a serious knee injury threatened to end his full-time career. He later played for Brighton & Hove Albion, before ending his professional career at Shrewsbury Town.

As well as working on corporate hospitality for Norwich City, Barham also runs his own tool-hire company in Norwich.

References

External links
Ex-Canaries.co.uk

Living people
1962 births
People from Folkestone
English footballers
England international footballers
Association football midfielders
Norwich City F.C. players
Huddersfield Town A.F.C. players
Middlesbrough F.C. players
Hythe Town F.C. players
West Bromwich Albion F.C. players
Brighton & Hove Albion F.C. players
Shrewsbury Town F.C. players
Kitchee SC players
Sittingbourne F.C. players
Southwick F.C. players
Fakenham Town F.C. players
English Football League players
Expatriate footballers in Hong Kong
English expatriate sportspeople in Hong Kong
English expatriate footballers